General elections were held in Sweden between 1 and 16 September 1917. The Swedish Social Democratic Party remained the largest party, winning 86 of the 230 seats in the Second Chamber of the Riksdag. As a result the Rightist Prime Minister Carl Swartz resigned the premiership and was replaced by Liberal leader Nils Edén.

Results

References

General elections in Sweden
Sweden
General
Sweden